Jinggangshan Airport , also known as Ji'an Airport, is an airport serving the city of Ji'an in Jiangxi province, China.

The airport is located in Taihe County which is under the administration of Ji'an,  from the urban area of Ji'an.

Facilities

Airlines and destinations

See also

 List of airports in China

References

Further reading
 "井冈山机场3条航线获批自主定价" (Archive). Jinggangshan Daily. 2015-01-21.

Airports in Jiangxi
Buildings and structures in Ji'an
Taihe County, Jiangxi